Who Cares is a 1925 American silent drama film produced and distributed by Columbia Pictures and starring Dorothy Devore.  It is based upon the 1919 novel by Cosmo Hamilton which had been previously filmed in 1919 as Who Cares?

Real life husband and wife, actors Vera and Ralph Lewis, play the grandparents.

Cast

Preservation
A print of Who Cares is preserved in the Library of Congress collection.

References

External links

1925 films
Columbia Pictures films
Films based on British novels
1925 drama films
American silent feature films
American black-and-white films
Silent American drama films
Remakes of American films
1920s American films